Jan Drozdowski (1857–1918) was a Polish pianist and music teacher.

Drozdowski was born  in Kraków. He was the son of Stanisław Magdzicki, who took part in the Kraków uprising and founded one of the first piano factories in Poland under the name Jan Drozdowski in Kraków. Jan received a thorough musical education. From 1876 to 1880 he studied piano with Josef Dachs and music theory with Anton Bruckner at the University of Music and Performing Arts in Vienna. After returning to Poland, he continued his studies with Aleksander Michałowski.

Adolf Chybiński was one of his students.

References 

1857 births
1918 deaths
Academic staff of the Academy of Music in Kraków
Musicians from Kraków
19th-century Polish pianists
University of Music and Performing Arts Vienna alumni
20th-century Polish pianists